Dreibelbis Mill  is a historic grist mill located in Perry Township, Berks County, Pennsylvania.  The mill was built in 1854, and is a 2 1/2-story, brick building on a banked stone basement.  The mill remained in operation until 1985.  After 1944, it was powered by a diesel engine.

It was listed on the National Register of Historic Places in 1990.

Gallery

References

Grinding mills in Berks County, Pennsylvania
Grinding mills on the National Register of Historic Places in Pennsylvania
Industrial buildings completed in 1854
National Register of Historic Places in Berks County, Pennsylvania
1854 establishments in Pennsylvania